Winston Churchill Mafi (born 21 March 1980 in Nukualofa, Tonga) is a Tongan rugby union footballer who usually plays an outside centre. He currently plays for the Rugby Club I Cavalieri Prato club in the Italian Top12. He is the older brother of Alfred Mafi.

In 2000 and 2001 he played for Penrith, before taking two years off to work as a missionary in Victoria. After playing for Sydney University, he was recruited for the Waratahs for their 2004 tour of Argentina. Following the tour he signed a two-year contract. In May 2006 he injured his knee while playing for Eastwood in the Shute Shield final and was sidelined. He was released from the team in 2007.

In June 2010 he extended his contract with Cavalieri.

References

External links
Winston Mafi on ercrugby.com

Tongan rugby union players
1980 births
Living people
People from Nukuʻalofa
New South Wales Waratahs players
Tongan expatriate rugby union players
Expatriate rugby union players in Australia
Expatriate rugby union players in Italy
Tongan expatriate sportspeople in Italy
Tongan expatriate sportspeople in Australia
Rugby union centres